Thesbia nana is a species of sea snail, a marine gastropod mollusk in the family Raphitomidae.

Description
The length of the shell attains 12 mm.

The body of the snail is milk-white, all but the gills and liver, which are light brown. The tentacles are cylindrical, rather short. The eyes are proportionally large, placed on the tentacles, close to their outer bases. The foot nis arrow and thin.

The shell is spindle-shaped, thin, semitransparent, and glossy. The sculpture shows numerous fine and narrow spiral impressed hues, of which there are about a dozen on the penultimate whorl. They are closely and regularly punctured, so as to form rows of circular dots. The top 
whorls are very closely and microscopically corrugated in the same direction. The colour is uniform milk-white. There is no epidermis perceptible . The  spire is tapering. The apex is abruptly twisted. The shell contains 4½ to 5½ whorls, convex and evenly rounded, rather suddenly enlarging; the last occupies about three-fifths of the shell. The suture is deep, somewhat oblique. The aperture is irregularly oblong, acute-angled above. Its length (including the siphonal canal) is two-fifths of the shel. The siphonal  canal is rather broad, inclining a little (but not abruptly) to the left, and ending in a slight and obliquely curved notch. The outer lip is flexuous, retreating at the upper part, but without exhibiting any fissure or notch . It folds inwards rather than outwards. The 
edge is sharp and thin. Inside it isquite smooth. The inner lip is slight, narrow, and even. The columella is flexuous. The fold is obscure. There is no operculum.

Distribution
This species occurs in the Atlantic Ocean from Eastern Canada to Norway and the Barentz Sea.

References

 McAndrew R. & Forbes E. (1847). Notices of new or rare British animals observed during cruises in 1845 and 1846. Annals and Magazine of Natural History 19: 96-98, pl. 9
 Gofas, S.; Le Renard, J.; Bouchet, P. (2001). Mollusca. in: Costello, M.J. et al. (eds), European Register of Marine Species: a check-list of the marine species in Europe and a bibliography of guides to their identification. Patrimoines Naturels. 50: 180-213
 Nekhaev, I.O. 2014. Marine shell-bearing gastropoda of Murman (Barentz Sea) - an annotated checklist.

External links
 Lovén, S. L. (1846). Index Molluscorum litora Scandinaviae occidentalia habitantium. Öfversigt af Kongliga Vetenskaps Akademiens Förhandlingar. (1846): 134-160, 182-204.
 Dyntaxa. (2013). Swedish Taxonomic Database
 Biolib.cz: Thesbia nana
 

nana
Gastropods described in 1846